Léon Vallas (17 May 1879 in Roanne – 9 May 1956 in Lyon) was a 20th-century French musicologist.

Biography
Orphaned at 8 years of age, after studying at the St. Mary's Institution at St. Chamond, held by the Marists, he passed his baccalaureate and studied medicine in Lyon, which he dropped out. In 1908, he defended a thesis of musicology on La Musique à l'Académie de Lyon au XVIIIe ("Music at the Academy of Lyon in the 17th Century").

A collaborator of Vincent d'Indy, in 1902 he became a music critic at Tout Lyon, then founded La Revue musicale de Lyon in 1903, which later became the Revue française de musique in 1912, and then the Nouvelle revue musicale in 1920.

A physician during the war, he received his doctorate in 1919 on Un Siècle de musique et de théâtre à Lyon (1688–1789) ("A Century of Music and Theatre in Lyon (1688–1789)") and returned to Le Progrès in Lyon where he was a music critic for 35 years.

In 1925, he founded the "Conférences de musique vivante" in Paris and taught courses at the Sorbonne from 1928 to 1930. From 1929 to 1935, he lectured worldwide for the Alliance Française, which led him to be made Chevalier de la Légion d'honneur in 1934.

He was elected president of the Société française de musicologie in 1937, until 1943 and a member of the Academy of Sciences, Humanities and Arts of Lyon in 1947. He applied twice (1924 and 1941), unsuccessfully, to the leadership of the Conservatoire de musique de Lyon.

He married pianist and singer Paule de Lestang in 1936, and then resided until his death at 286 rue Vendôme, in Lyon.

His biographies of Franck, Debussy and D'Indy constitute the essence of his work as a historian.

Publications 
 La Musique à l'Académie de Lyon au dix-huitième siècle (Lyon: Éditions de la Revue musicale de Lyon, 1908) (Read online)
 Le Théâtre et la Ville: 1694–1712 (Lyon: Cumin et Masson, 1919)
 Debussy (1862–1918) (Paris: Plon, 1926)
 Un Siècle de musique et de théâtre à Lyon (1688–1789) (Lyon: Masson, 1932)
 Les Idées de Claude Debussy, musicien français (Paris: Éditions musicales de la Librairie de France, 1927; translated into English by Maire O'Brien, Oxford: University Press, 1929)
 Claude Debussy et son temps (Paris: F. Alcan, 1932; reissued Paris: Albin Michel, 1958; translated into German, Munich: Nymphenburger Verlags-Handlung, 1961)
 Achille-Claude Debussy (Paris: Presses universitaires de France, 1944) (rééd. 1949)
 Vincent d'Indy (Paris: Albin Michel, 2 vols. (1. La Jeunesse, 1851–1886, 1946; 2. La Maturité, la vieillesse, 1886–1931, 1949)
 La Véritable histoire de César Franck (Paris: Flammarion, 1955)

References

Bibliography 
 Philippe Lebreton and Jean-Frédéric Schmitt, "Léon Vallas" in Centenaire de l’orchestre de Lyon 1905-2005

External links 
 Fonds Léon Vallas of the Bibliothèque municipale de Lyon
 Biographie (2014) on sbla-lyon.fr
 Léon Vallas on IdRef
 Léon Vallas on Prosopo

French biographers
20th-century French musicologists
Chevaliers of the Légion d'honneur
1879 births
People from Roanne
1956 deaths
Presidents of the Société française de musicologie
Debussy scholars